Hot Springs County is a county in the U.S. state of Wyoming. As of the 2020 United States Census, the population was 4,696, making it the second-least populous county in Wyoming. Its county seat is Thermopolis. The county is named for the hot springs located in Hot Springs State Park.

History
Hot Springs County was created on February 21, 1911, with of areas annexed from Big Horn, Fremont, and Park counties. It was organized in 1913.

Hot Springs County was named for the hot springs located in the county seat of Thermopolis.

In the 2008 United States presidential election, Hot Springs County was the only county in the entire Mountain West outside of Arizona where John McCain beat George W. Bush's percentage of the county vote from the 2004 election.

Geography
It is the smallest county in Wyoming by area and the largest county in the US that is a state's smallest county.

Hot Springs County includes the southern portion of Wyoming's Big Horn Basin, and is surrounded by mountains. Most of the Wind River Canyon, with the Owl Creek Mountains on the west and Bridger Mountains on the east is in Hot Springs County, while the Bighorn Mountains ring the east portion on the county and the Absaroka Range is to the west. A small portion of the Shoshone National Forest is in the western part of the county.

The Wind River Indian Reservation extends into southern Hot Springs County.

Adjacent counties
Washakie County – northeast
Fremont County – south and southwest
Park County – northwest and north

National protected area
Shoshone National Forest (part)

Demographics

2000 census
As of the 2000 United States Census, there were 4,882 people, 2,108 households, and 1,353 families in the county. The population density was 2 people per square mile (1/km2). There were 2,536 housing units at an average density of 1.3 per square mile (0.5/km2). The racial makeup of the county was 95.96% White, 0.35% Black or African American, 1.52% Native American, 0.25% Asian, 0.63% from other races, and 1.29% from two or more races. 2.38% of the population were Hispanic or Latino of any race. 23.3% were of German, 17.0% English, 12.2% Irish, 8.2% American and 6.0% Norwegian ancestry.

There were 2,108 households, out of which 25.50% had children under the age of 18 living with them, 54.30% were married couples living together, 7.40% had a female householder with no husband present, and 35.80% were non-families. 31.70% of all households were made up of individuals, and 14.80% had someone living alone who was 65 years of age or older. The average household size was 2.25 and the average family size was 2.82.

The county population contained 22.00% under the age of 18, 5.90% from 18 to 24, 23.30% from 25 to 44, 28.70% from 45 to 64, and 20.00% who were 65 years of age or older. The median age was 44 years. For every 100 females there were 92.70 males. For every 100 females age 18 and over, there were 89.80 males.

The median income for a household in the county was $29,888, and the median income for a family was $39,364. Males had a median income of $27,030 versus $18,667 for females. The per capita income for the county was $16,858. About 8.60% of families and 10.60% of the population were below the poverty line, including 12.10% of those under age 18 and 7.90% of those age 65 or over.

2010 census
As of the 2010 United States Census, there were 4,812 people, 2,185 households, and 1,362 families in the county. The racial makeup of the county was 95.8% white, 1.5% American Indian, 0.4% Asian, 0.2% black or African American, 0.1% Pacific islander, 0.5% from other races, and 1.5% from two or more races. Those of Hispanic or Latino origin made up 2.2% of the population. In terms of ancestry, 30.1% were German, 15.3% were Irish, 15.1% were English, 8.4% were Scotch-Irish, and 8.3% were American.

Of the 2,185 households, 23.5% had children under the age of 18 living with them, 50.5% were married couples living together, 8.3% had a female householder with no husband present, 37.7% were non-families, and 32.6% of all households were made up of individuals. The average household size was 2.16 and the average family size was 2.70. The median age was 48.6 years.

The median income for a household in the county was $42,469 and the median income for a family was $54,709. Males had a median income of $41,186 versus $26,990 for females. The per capita income for the county was $25,269. About 6.8% of families and 9.1% of the population were below the poverty line, including 12.2% of those under age 18 and 5.7% of those age 65 or over.

Communities

Towns
 East Thermopolis
 Kirby
 Thermopolis (county seat)

Census-designated places
 Lucerne
 Owl Creek

Unincorporated communities
 Embar
 Grass Creek
 Wedding of the Waters

Ghost Towns
 Gebo

Government and infrastructure
The Wyoming Department of Health Wyoming Pioneer Home, a nursing home for elderly people, is located in Thermopolis. The facility was operated by the Wyoming Board of Charities and Reform until that agency was dissolved as a result of a state constitutional amendment passed in November 1990.

Hot Springs County voters have been reliably Republican for many decades. In only one national election since 1948 did the county select the Democratic Party candidate (as of 2020).

See also

National Register of Historic Places listings in Hot Springs County, Wyoming
Clayton Danks
Wyoming
List of cities and towns in Wyoming
List of counties in Wyoming
Wyoming statistical areas

References

External links

 Hot Springs County official website

 
1913 establishments in Wyoming
Populated places established in 1913